Hakea macrocarpa, commonly known as dogwood hakea, is a shrub or tree in the family  Proteaceae.  It has cream-yellow flowers from May to June. It is native to Western Australia and the Northern Territory.

Description
The trunk and branches have black-brown furrowed bark and it is able to resprout from the base. Branchlets are covered in fine matted hair. It blooms from May to October and produces cream-green-yellow flowers.

Taxonomy
The species was first formally described by the botanist Robert Brown as published in the work Proteaceas Novas. Supplementum primum prodromi florae Novae Hollandiae. The recognised synonyms are Grevillea alphonsiana published by Ferdinand von Mueller and Hakea morrisoniana, described as a new species by William Vincent Fitzgerald in 1918, the epithet commemorating Alexander Morrison. The specific epithet is derived from the ancient Greek words makros (μακρός) meaning "long" and karpos (καρπός) meaning "fruit".

Distribution
It is endemic to an area in the central Northern Territory and the Kimberley, Pilbara and Goldfields-Esperance region of Western Australia where it has a scattered distribution. The plant is commonly found among coastal sand dunes, on sandplains and on and around rocky ridges where it grows in red sandy soils.

References

macrocarpa
Eudicots of Western Australia
Taxa named by Robert Brown (botanist, born 1773)
Plants described in 1830